Eucalyptus guilfoylei, commonly known as yellow tingle or dingul dingul, is a species of tall tree that is endemic to Western Australia. The trunk is straight with fibrous, greyish brown bark and it has lance-shaped leaves, flower buds in groups of seven, white flowers and barrel-shaped fruit.

Description
The flower buds are arranged in groups of seven on branching peduncles in leaf axils and on the ends of branchlets. Flowering occurs between November and January and the flowers are white. They contain flattened saucer shaped red-brown seeds.

Although closely related to the other tingle trees, E. brevistylis and E. jacksonii, the trunk of E. guilfoylei is not buttressed, the bark is persistent, the wood is yellow and the leaves are paler on the lower surface. All the tingles are able to reach 400 years of age.

Taxonomy and naming
The species was first described by the botanist Joseph Maiden in 1911 in his article Notes on Western Australian eucalypts, including description of new species in the Journal of the Natural History and Science Society of Western Australia. The type material was collected by Andrew Murphy in 1905 near Denmark. The name honours William Guilfoyle, who once was the Director of the Royal Botanic Gardens in Melbourne.

Distribution
Found on slopes and ridges in coastal areas of the Great Southern region where it grows in gravelly loam soils. Found between the Deep and Frankland Rivers west of Albany, on slopes and ridges of hilly country. It occurs as scattered trees in forested areas associated with other large trees, such as Eucalyptus diversicolor, Corymbia calophylla or Eucalyptus jacksonii. The yellow tingle grows best in deep red loamy soils originating from basalt and dolerite but will grow in light loams from granite and schists.

The species was reported as occurring with several plant species, often as the understorey of the E. jacksonii, which is distinguished by its larger size, more fibrous bark and the name red tingle tingle (a variation of a common name, as 'yellow tingle tingle', was also once in popular use for this species). Other associated trees include river banksia and Agonis flexuosa. The tree resembles jarrah but for its less rough bark and light brown wood.

Uses
The heartwood is hard and straight-grained with an oak-like yellow colour. The wood has a green density of about 1185 kg/m3 and an air-dried density about 990 kg/m3.

See also
List of Eucalyptus species

References 

Trees of Australia
Trees of Mediterranean climate
guilfoylei
Myrtales of Australia
Eucalypts of Western Australia
Plants described in 1911
Taxa named by Joseph Maiden
Endemic flora of Southwest Australia